Niels Vermeersch, also known by his pseudonym Nicholas de Mersch d'Oyenberghe, is a Belgian micronationalist and the founder of the Grand Duchy of Flandrensis. He has been mentioned in several international publications about Flandrensis and micronationalism.  Since 2021 he is the chairman of the environmental non-profit organization “vzw Groothertogdom Flandrensis”.

Micronational career 

According several publications Niels started Flandrensis in 2008 as a temporally hobby without any longterm intention, but the project quickly developed into a political simulation and later into a cultural organization. Since 2016 the main focus is on Antarctica and climate change. In 2021 Niels registered his micronation in Belgium as an environmental non-profit organization (vzw groothertogdom Flandrensis) that uses the concept of micronationalism to raise awareness on climate change. 

Niels is a frequent guest and speaker at micronational meetings and international conferences like the Polination Conferences in London  (2012) and Perugia (2015), Aigues-Mortes (2016) and Vincennes (2018). Some of the subjects were “Hobby-micronationalism in the 21st century”, “The influence of the internet on micronationalism” and “Ecological micronationalism”. In 2014 the French newspaper “Le Journal du Dimanche” described him as the “Woodrow Wilson of micronationalism”.

Environmental micronationalism 
Niels is one of the first who introduced the concept of environmental micronationalism, using micronationalism to raise awareness for climate change. Due this unique concept Niels and his micronation receives attention from media and academics in publication on micronationalism.
He is the co-author of several ecological charters. After President Trump announced in 2017 to withdraw the U.S.A. from the Paris Agreement, Niels took the initiative for the “Micronational Declaration on Ecological Stewardship”, signed at the international micronational convention MicroCon in Atlanta (U.S.A.).
In May 2022 Niels was invited as a speaker on ChangeNow, an international climate summit in Paris to tell about environmental micronationalism.

Trivia  
In 2014 the micronation Flandrensis – with Niels as central guest - was the theme of the television show "Normale Mensen" on the Belgian channel Één. 
During the Flemish regional elections in 2018 Niels was a candidate on the list of a local green-liberal party (Tope8920, place 12) in the town Langemark-Poelkapelle, but was not elected. A key part of his campaign was promotion of a local currency, using the micronation Aigues-Mortes as example.
The Micronational Hall of Excellence is an institution created with the goal of preserving history and recognizing the contributions of significant individuals in the field of micronationalism. Niels was one of the eight individuals who received the Norton Award and was inducted during MicroCon 2022 in Las Vegas. Other nominees were Emperor Norton, Paddy Roy Bates, Kevin Baugh, Travis McHenry, Lars Vilks, Leonard Casley and Gabrielle Pourchet.

References

External links
Official website

1988 births
Living people
Micronational leaders